The mausoleum of Abu Hurayra, or Rabban Gamaliel's Tomb, is a maqām and synagogue located in HaSanhedrin Park in Yavne, Israel, formerly belonging to the depopulated Palestinian village of Yibna. It has been described as "one of the finest domed mausoleums in Palestine."

The mausoleum is located on a burial ground, northwest of Tel Yavne, that has been used by Yavnehites for burial since at least the Roman period. Since the early 13th century, it has been known to Muslims as a tomb of Abu Hurairah, a companion (sahaba) of Muhammad, although most Arabic sources give Medina as his burial place. The date of the inner tomb chamber is uncertain, with contemporary sources allowing the assumption that a tomb chamber existed at the site and was associated with Abu Hurairah already before Sultan Baybars's additions. In 1274, Baybars ordered the construction of the riwaq featuring a tripartite portal and six tiny domes together with a dedicatory inscription, with the site expanded further in 1292 by Mamluk Sultan Al-Ashraf Khalil.

The tomb is known to Jews as the Tomb of Rabban Gamaliel of Yavne, the first Nasi of the Sanhedrin after the fall of the Second Temple. A Hebrew travel guide dated to between 1266 and 1291 attributes the tomb to Gamaliel and describes it as being occupied by a Muslim prayer house. The site was frequently visited by Jewish medieval pilgrims. Following the 1948 Arab–Israeli War the mausoleum was officially designated as a shrine for Jews by the Israeli government.

In all likelihood neither Rabban Gamaliel of Yavne nor Abu Hurairah are buried in the tomb.

History

Pre-Muslim times
The ground on which the structure stands, northwest of Tel Yavne, has been used by Yavnehites for burial since at least the Roman period.

Crusader/Ayyubid period
Ali of Herat (d. 1215), followed by Yaqut (d. 1229) and the Marasid al-ittila'  (an abridgement of Yaqut's work by Safi al-Din 'Abd al-Mu'min ibn 'Abd al-Haqq, d.1338), mention that in Yubna there was a tomb said to be that of Abu Hurairah, the companion (sahaba) of the  Prophet. The Marasid also adds that the tomb seen here is also said to be that of ʿAbd Allah ibn Abi Sarh, another  companion of the Prophet.

Yavne's population at the time was a mixture of Muslims, Samaritans, and - during the Crusader period - Christians, with Benjamin of Tudela (12th century) finding no Jewish inhabitants there.

Mamluk period
Most of the current structure was built during the Mamluk period, with successive additions to a pre-existing tomb chamber apparently already associated with Abu Hureirah.

A Hebrew travel guide dated between 1266 and 1291 mentions that the tomb of Rabban Gamaliel in Yavne is used as a Muslim prayer house. The following century, another Jewish traveler, Ishtori Haparchi, described  Abu Huraira's mausoleum as 'a very fine memorial to Rabbi Gamliel.'

Ottoman and British Mandate periods

In 1863 Victor Guérin visited, describing the site as a mosque. In 1882, Conder and Kitchener described it: "The mosque of Abu Hureireh is a handsome building under a dome, and contains two inscriptions, the first in the outer court, the second in the wall of the interior."

During the British Mandate of Palestine the porch of the building was used for school rooms.

State of Israel
Following the 1948 Arab–Israeli War, immigrant Sephardic Jews from Arab countries  began to pray at the site due to their belief that the tomb is the burial place of Rabban Gamaliel of Yavne, the first Nasi of the Sanhedrin after the fall of the Second Temple. The identification of the site as Gamaliel's tomb was based on the literature of medieval Jewish pilgrims, who frequently mentioned visits to the site. The claim of previous Jewish origin were based on the argument that many such maqamat (maqams), or Muslim sacred tombs, were originally Jewish tombs that had been Islamized during the later history of the region. The Israeli Ministry of Religious Services has maintained authority over the site since 1948, and the structure was thereafter appropriated by ultra-Orthodox Jews and transformed into a tomb of the righteous. Gideon Bar cites it as one of many cases of the Judaization of Muslim holy places, where the Jewish heritage of a site has been showcased at the expense of other local cultural traditions.

Architecture
Until 1948 the building stood within a walled compound containing other graves (the compound wall and the graves have since been removed). There were two inscriptions above the gateway; one in the name of Sultan Baybars dated 673 H. (1274 c.e.) and another dated to 806 H. (1403 C.E.)

A cenotaph is located in centre of the tomb chamber. The cenotaph is a rectangular structure  with four marble corner posts formed as turbans. The four lower courses are made of ashlar blocks, while the upper course is of marble ornamented with niches in Gothic style.

Much of the construction materials of the building are reused Byzantine marble, mainly columns and Corinthian capitals.

Inscriptions
The first inscription, dated 1274, described how Mamluk Sultan Baybars (reigned 1260–77) ordered the construction of the riwaq. It also refers to the Wali of Ramleh, Khalil ibn Sawir, who was named by the chronicler Ibn al-Furat as being responsible for instigating the famed attempted assassination of Edward I of England in June 1272 in the Ninth Crusade.

The second inscription described further construction ordered in 1292 by Mamluk Sultan Al-Ashraf Khalil (reigned 1290–93).

Facilities 
The tomb contains a large hall, offices, and a small Orthodox synagogue. Facilities around the tomb include restrooms, water fountains, a Yahrzeit candelabra, and tables for festive meals (seudat mitzvah). The tomb indication itself is covered with a blue ornamental cloth. The tomb is renowned among some Jews as a matchmaking and fertility site.

Gallery

See also 
Yibna
Gamaliel II

References

Bibliography 

 (Also cited in Petersen, 2001, p. 313)

 

 (Cited in Petersen (2001))

 Cited in Sharon, 2007. 

, (pp. 29  -31)
 

Taragan, Hana, Historical reference in medieval Islamic architecture: Baybar's buildings in Palestine. Bulletin of the Israeli Academic Center in Cairo 25 (2002) 31–34

External links 
 Mausoleum of Abu Huraira – archnet.org
Survey of Western Palestine, Map 16:   IAA, Wikimedia commons

Mausoleums in Israel
Jews and Judaism in the Roman Empire
Orthodox synagogues in Israel
Jewish pilgrimage sites